The Women's +75 kg event at the 2010 South American Games was held over March 29 at 16:00.

Medalists

Results

References
Final

+75kg W